John Russell Young (November 20, 1840 – January 17, 1899) was an American journalist, author, diplomat, and the seventh Librarian of the United States Congress from 1897 to 1899. He was invited by Ulysses S. Grant to accompany him on a world tour for purposes of recording the two-year journey, which he published in a two-volume work.

Biography
Young was born in County Tyrone, Ireland, but as a young child his family emigrated to Philadelphia.  He entered the newspaper business as a proofreader at age 15.  As a reporter for the Philadelphia Press, he distinguished himself with his coverage of the First Battle of Bull Run. By 1862 he was managing editor of the Press and another newspaper.  
 
In 1865 he moved to New York, where he became a close friend of Henry George and helped to distribute Progress and Poverty.  He began writing for Horace Greeley's New York Tribune and became managing editor of that paper.  He also began working for the government, undertaking missions to Europe for the US Department of State and the US Department of the Treasury.  In 1872, he joined the New York Herald and reported for them from Europe.

Young was invited to accompany President Ulysses S. Grant on Grant's famous 1877-1879 world tour, chronicled in Young's book Around the World with General Grant.  Young impressed Grant, especially in China where Young struck up a friendship with Li Hongzhang.  Grant persuaded President Chester A. Arthur to appoint Young minister to China in 1882.  In this position he distinguished himself by mediating and settling disputes between the US and China and France and China. Unlike many other diplomats, he opposed the policy of removing Korea from Chinese suzerainty. 

In 1885 he resumed working for the Herald in Europe.  In 1890 he returned to Philadelphia.  In 1897 President William McKinley appointed him Librarian of Congress, the first librarian confirmed by Congress.  During his tenure, the library began moving from its original home in the US Capitol Building to its own structure, an accomplishment largely the responsibility of his predecessor, Ainsworth Rand Spofford.  Spofford served as Chief Assistant Librarian under Young.  Young held the post of librarian until his death.

He died in Washington, D.C. on January 17, 1899, and is interred at Mount Moriah Cemetery in Philadelphia, Pennsylvania.

His brother was Congressman James Rankin Young. His son was Brig. Gen. Gordon Russell Young, who was Engineer Commission of the District of Columbia from 1945-1951 and a recipient of the Distinguished Service Medal and the Legion of Merit.

See also

 Bibliography of Ulysses S. Grant

Works (partial list)
 "New Life in China" The North American Review, vol. 153 (1891) pp. 420-431.
 "The Chinese Question Again" The North American Review, vol. 154 (1892) pp. 596-602.

References

External links
 
 

19th-century Irish people
1840 births
1899 deaths
People from County Tyrone
19th-century American diplomats
American non-fiction writers
Burials at Mount Moriah Cemetery (Philadelphia)
Irish emigrants to the United States (before 1923)
Librarians of Congress
19th-century American journalists
American male journalists
19th-century male writers
Ambassadors of the United States to China